Casolla is an Italian surname. Notable people with the surname include:

Francesco Casolla (born 1992), Italian footballer
Giovanna Casolla (born 1945), Italian opera singer

See also
Casella (disambiguation)

Italian-language surnames